Alfred Benjamin Ellis (July [?], 1870 – July 26, 1931) was an infielder in Major League Baseball who played for the Philadelphia Phillies during the  season. He was born in New York City.

Basically a third baseman, Ellis played all infield positions, except first base, and also served as a corner outfielder. In four career games, he collected one hit in 16 career at-bats and received three walks for a   .063 batting average and a .211 on-base percentage, respectively.  It is unknown which hand he batted and threw with.

In addition, he played or managed in the Minor leagues during eight seasons spanning 1893–1900.

Ellis died in Schenectady, New York, at the age of 61.

Sources

1870 births
1931 deaths
Major League Baseball infielders
Philadelphia Phillies players
Minor league baseball managers
Allentown Colts players
Detroit Tigers (Western League) players
Easton Dutchmen players
New Bedford Browns players
New Bedford Whalers (baseball) players
Newport Colts players
Philadelphia Athletics (minor league) players
Pottsville Colts players
Reading Actives players
Reading Coal Heavers players
Rome Romans players
Shamokin Actives players
Utica Pent Ups players
Utica Pentups players
Utica Reds players
Baseball players from New York City
19th-century baseball players